A1 Team Canada is the Canadian team of A1 Grand Prix, an international racing series.

Management 
A1 Team Canada's previous seat holder was Jay Laski. However Wade Cherwayko took over and became the current seat holder.

History

2008–09 season 
The team did not race, apparently due to a lack of sponsorship cash.

2007–08 season 

Drivers: James Hinchcliffe, Robert Wickens

After an uncompetitive start, Robert Wickens scored all of the team's 75 points in 2007–08, as well as picking up another victory and four podiums. The team finished 9th overall.

2006–07 season 

Drivers: James Hinchcliffe, Sean McIntosh

Although the team scored in less races, Team Canada still managed to pick up a podium and finish in 11th position.

2005–06 season 

Drivers: Patrick Carpentier, Sean McIntosh

Team Canada had mixed fortunes during the first season. A victory, and a podium finish along with other consistent scoring helped them to finish in 11th position.

Drivers

Complete A1 Grand Prix results 

(key), "spr" indicate a Sprint Race, "fea" indicate a Main Race.

References

External links
A1gp.com Official A1 Grand Prix Web Site

Canada A1 team
National sports teams of Canada
Canadian auto racing teams
Auto racing teams established in 2005
Auto racing teams disestablished in 2008